The discography of Dutch singer Marco Borsato consists of thirteen studio albums, three live albums, five compilation albums, two box sets, eight video albums and 43 singles.

Albums

Studio albums

Live albums

Compilation albums

Box sets

Video albums

Singles

As lead artist

Featured singles

Other appearances

Other charted songs

Notes

References

Pop music group discographies
Discographies of Dutch artists